The 2021–22 season is Oldham Athletic's 127th year in their history and fourth consecutive season in League Two. Along with the league, the club will also compete in the FA Cup, the EFL Cup and the EFL Trophy. The season covers the period from 1 July 2021 to 30 June 2022. It was the most disastrous season in the club's history, which resulted in relegation and loss of English Football League status after 115 years.

Players

Squad at the end of the season

Left the club during the season

Pre-season friendlies
Oldham Athletic announced pre-season friendlies against Ashton United, Stalybridge Celtic, Wigan Athletic, Burnley, Crewe Alexandra and Huddersfield Town as part of their preparations for the new campaign.

Competitions

League Two

League table

Results summary

Results by matchday

Matches
Oldham's fixtures were announced on 24 June 2021.

FA Cup

Oldham were drawn away to Ipswich Town in the first round.

EFL Cup

Oldham Athletic were drawn at home to Tranmere Rovers in the first round, Accrington Stanley in the second round and away to Brentford in the third round.

EFL Trophy

The Latics were drawn into Northern Group B alongside Leeds United U21s, Salford City and Tranmere Rovers. The group stage fixture dates were confirmed on 7 July. In the knock-out stages, Oldham were drawn at home to Wigan Athletic in the third round.

Transfers

Transfers in

Loans in

Loans out

Transfers out

Squad statistics

Appearances
Players with no appearances are not included on the list.

Goals

Disciplinary Record

References

Oldham Athletic
Oldham Athletic A.F.C. seasons